Tha Maka is the southeasternmost district (amphoe) of Kanchanaburi province, central Thailand.

Geography
Neighbouring districts are (from the west clockwise) Tha Muang, Phanom Thuan of Kanchanaburi Province, Song Phi Nong of Suphanburi province, Kamphaeng San of Nakhon Pathom province, and Ban Pong of Ratchaburi province.

The important water resource is the Mae Klong River.

History
Tha Maka was originally part of Ratchaburi Province, and named Lat Bua Khao (ลาดบัวขาว). In 1903 it was renamed Phra Thaen (พระแท่น), In 1917 it received its current name, Tha Maka. In 1937 the district was reassigned to Kanchanaburi, with only the sub-district Lat Bua Khao changed to Ban Pong and remaining in Ratchaburi.

Administration
The district is divided into 17 sub-districts (tambons), which are further subdivided into 153 villages (mubans). Tha Ruea Phra Thaen is a town (thesaban mueang) and covers tambon Tha Ruea and parts of Takhram En. There are five townships (thesaban tambons) in the district. There are 15 tambon administrative organizations (TAO).

References

External links

 http://www.thamaka.com Website of district
amphoe.com

Tha Maka